Kongahawela is a village in Sri Lanka. It is located within Central Province.

See also
List of towns in Central Province, Sri Lanka
Find Kongahawela on Google Map
https://www.google.com/maps/place/Kongahawela,+Sri+Lanka/@7.6904499,80.6987856,14z/data=!3m1!4b1!4m5!3m4!1s0x3afcaca94e1c9075:0xe013114b5d7bcab0!8m2!3d7.6897523!4d80.7158977

External links

Populated places in Matale District